Mufti Mohammad Sayeed  was sworn in as Chief Minister of Jammu and Kashmir on 2 November 2002. The list of ministers:

Cabinet ministers

References

2002 in Indian politics
Jammu and Kashmir Peoples Democratic Party
Jammu and Kashmir National Panthers Party
Indian National Congress
Mufti Mohammad Sayeed
2002 establishments in Jammu and Kashmir
2005 disestablishments in India
Cabinets established in 2002
Cabinets disestablished in 2005